Kala Malam Bulan Mengambang (English: When the Full Moon Rises) is a 2008 Malaysian Malay-language neo-noir comedy film directed by Mamat Khalid, released on 15 January 2008.

Plot
Saleh (Rosyam Nor), a reporter, finds himself stranded in a village after his car tire is punctured by a strange keris. During his stay, he meets the beautiful and mysterious Cik Putih (Umie Aida), sister to the mechanic Jongkidin, and is immediately smitten. At the same time, he also finds out that when there is a full moon, a man would disappear from the village. Rumours start to spread about a pontianak who is killing their men for their blood. Saleh decides to stay a little longer to solve the mystery, even after being advised to leave the village by Doreen (Corrien Adrienne). Who has been kidnapping the men? What is the secret of the village?

Cast
 Rosyam Nor as Saleh
 Umie Aida  as Cik Putih
 Farid Kamil as Jongkiding
 Avaa Vanja as Miss Rogayah
 Corrien Adrienne as Doreen Chua
 Bront Palarae as Mahinder Singh
 M. Hitler Zami as Sergeant Ismail
 Adam Corrie as Correy 
 Soffi Jikan as Communist Leader
 David Teo as Hotel Owner
 Ruminah Sidek as Old Woman
 Soya as Fuad
 Kay Maria as Miss Rogayah's mother
 Dewa Sapri as Miss Rogayah's father
 Kuswadinata as Dr. Rushdi

References

External links
 

2008 films
Malay-language films
2008 romantic comedy films
Films directed by Mamat Khalid
Films with screenplays by Mamat Khalid
Tayangan Unggul films
Malaysian romantic comedy films
Films produced by Gayatri Su-Lin Pillai